The B14 is a two person monohull dinghy, designed by Julian Bethwaite. It is recognised as an international class by the International Sailing Federation. The boat was designed in 1984.

Performance and design
The B14 is designed with a low center of gravity for added stability and an open transom, to help the boat to drain itself quickly and without need of a self-bailer. The mast is set far back in the boat to make room for the large asymmetric spinnaker.
The boat has a fast handicap, with a Portsmouth Yardstick of 870, designed with racing in mind. For this reason it is highly suitable for more experienced sailors. The boat does not have a trapeze, but instead makes use of wide wings.

History
 Architect: Julian Bethwaite
 Design year: 1986

Events

World Champions

Various
 Ideal weight of the crew: 130–180 kg
 RYA handicap 2012 : 870
 D-PN: 81.0.

References

External links

 Class homepage
 French Class
 Details at www.noblemarine.co.uk
 ISAF B14 Microsite Website
  ISAF Homepage

Classes of World Sailing
Dinghies
Two-person sailboats
1980s sailboat type designs
Sailboat type designs by Julian Bethwaite